The Holyland Model of Jerusalem, also known as Model of Jerusalem at the end of the Second Temple period is a 1:50 scale model of the city of Jerusalem in the late Second Temple period. The model was moved from its original location at the Holyland Hotel in Bayit VeGan, Jerusalem, to a new site at the Israel Museum in June 2006.

History

The model was designed by Israeli historian and geographer Michael Avi-Yonah based on the writings of Flavius Josephus and other historical sources. The model includes a replica of the Herodian Temple. From 1974, Yoram Tsafrir (1938–2015) superintended the Holyland Model of Jerusalem.

In 2006, the model was relocated to the southern edge of the Billy Rose Sculpture Garden at the Israel Museum. In preparation for the move, the model was sawn into 100 pieces and later reassembled. The Holyland Hotel spent $3.5 million on the move.

Notable depictions 
The Jerusalem model features a number of notable and important structures, as the model was based on the writings of Josephus at the time of its construction. Since then some modifications have been made to the model- such as the removal of the Hippodrome.

Districts 
The city was divided into a number of districts, listed as follows.
 City of David
 Upper City
 Lower City
 Bezetha
 Ophel

Notable structures  
Following is a list of notable structures that are depicted in the Holyland Model of Jerusalem
 Temple Mount: the model depicts the Temple Mount and the Herodian Temple during the first century CE, the trail offers the view of the Temple Mount from the east.
 Pool of Bethesda
 Pool of Siloam
 Notable Towers: Mariamne Tower, Phasael Tower, Hippicus Tower 
 Herod's Palace
 The Upper Market
 Herod's Theatre
 Hippodrome (now removed from the model)
 Monument of King Alexander Jannaeus
 Tomb of Huldah
 Antonia Fortress
 Tomb of King David
 Fish Gate: It was located somewhere near (probably eastwards) the modern Damascus Gate, close to the fish market. It is also believed to have been mentioned in the Book of Nehemiah.
 Psephenus Tower: It was located on the north-western corner of the third wall of Jerusalem.

See also

 Jerusalem during the Second Temple Period
 Replicas of the Jewish Temple
 Second Temple

References

Further reading

External links

 Israeli museum website

Miniature parks
Temple Mount
Dioramas
Second Temple
Herod the Great
Collections of the Israel Museum